"A Walk" is a song written by American musician Greg Graffin from American punk rock group Bad Religion. It was the first single from their 1996 album The Gray Race. It was the album's only single to chart in the United States.

Chart positions

References 

1996 singles
Bad Religion songs
Song recordings produced by Ric Ocasek
1996 songs
Songs written by Greg Graffin
Atlantic Records singles
Murmur (record label) singles